This was the first edition of the tournament.

Máximo González won the title, defeating Albert Ramos in the final, 6–3, 6–4.

Seeds

Draw

Finals

Top half

Bottom half

References
 Main Draw
 Qualifying Draw

Challenger Team Citta di Padova - Singles